The Pedro Zaraza Municipality is one of the 15 municipalities (municipios) that makes up the central Venezuelan state of Guárico and, according to a 2007 population estimate by the National Institute of Statistics of Venezuela, the municipality has a population of 60,595.  The town of Zaraza is the shire town of the Pedro Zaraza Municipality.

Demographics
The Pedro Zaraza Municipality, according to a 2007 population estimate by the National Institute of Statistics of Venezuela, has a population of 60,595 (up from 55,957 in 2000). This amounts to 8.1% of the state's population.

Government
The mayor of the Pedro Zaraza Municipality is Freddi Ali Gomez, elected on November 23, 2008   The municipality is divided into two parishes; Capital Zaraza and San José de Unare.

See also
Zaraza
Guárico
Municipalities of Venezuela

References

External links
pedrozaraza-guarico.gov.ve 

Municipalities of Guárico